Mark Russell Martin (born February 18, 1968) is an American politician who served as the secretary of state of Arkansas from January 2011 to January 2019. He is a former three-term member of the Arkansas House of Representatives for District 87 in Washington County in Northwest Arkansas.

Electoral history

References

|-

1968 births
Living people
21st-century American politicians
21st-century American engineers
Baptists from Arkansas
Republican Party members of the Arkansas House of Representatives
People from Prairie Grove, Arkansas
People from St. Francis County, Arkansas
Politicians from Kansas City, Kansas
Secretaries of State of Arkansas
United States Navy sailors
University of Arkansas alumni